Chad Ford (born 1971) is a professor at Brigham Young University – Hawaii (BYUH). He served as the director of the university's McKay Center for Intercultural Understanding from 2005-2021 and is known for his study of conflict resolution with an emphasis on large group ethnic and religious conflict, as well as for his sports journalism with ESPN. He is the author of the book Dangerous Love: Transforming Fear and Conflict at Home, at Work and the World.

Early life
Ford was born in Kansas City, Missouri, in 1971. He holds a B.A. in history at Brigham Young University (1995), an M.S. in conflict analysis and resolution at George Mason University (2000), and a J.D. in Law at Georgetown University. He also served as a researcher for the United Nations in Northern Ireland.

Career
Before joining the faculty of Brigham Young University in 2005, Ford co-founded sportsTALK.com with Jason Peery in 1996 which was sold to ESPN in 2001 and was renamed Insider. Ford still contributes  to the subscription's content. He is known for his "insider information" and breaking news on NBA stories, especially regarding the draft, trade rumors, and international basketball. By 2005, more than 1 million paying Insider subscribers read his daily reports for ESPN.

As a mediator and facilitator, Ford works for several projects around the world, including in the Middle East with PeacePlayers International. Additionally, he served as the managing director of global peacebuilding (2007), teaches at BYUH while directing the university's McKay Center. The center functions as a cross-cultural peacebuilding laboratory for the education of students, faculty, staff and community members. The theoretical and practical tools learned in the center enable the sponsorship of community building, cultural leadership opportunities and projects throughout the world.  He also did research for the United Nations in Northern Ireland.

On April 28, 2017, he was laid off by ESPN alongside about 100 others at the network.

References

External links
Chad Ford on ESPN.com (subscription required to read his columns)

BYUH faculty page

Georgetown University Law Center alumni
Brigham Young University–Hawaii alumni
People from Kansas City, Missouri
George Mason University alumni
American sportswriters
Brigham Young University–Hawaii faculty
1971 births
Living people